Girl is a 2019 novel by Irish author Edna O'Brien. The book's plot is inspired by the Chibok schoolgirls kidnapping, and is narrated by a fictional victim, Maryam.

History and composition
O'Brien first conceived of the novel after reading about a girl kidnapped by Boko Haram in a magazine at a doctor's office. O'Brien does not type her books, and as with others wrote Girl on loose paper, periodically dictating pages to a typist.

Reception
Writing for The Guardian, Alex Clark praised the novel, saying: "Everything that O’Brien does memorably throughout her novels, she does here."

According to literary review aggregator Book Marks, the novel received mostly positive reviews.

References

2019 Irish novels
Novels by Edna O'Brien
Novels set in Nigeria
Novels about terrorism
Boko Haram
Faber and Faber books